The 1986 season of the Bhutanese A-Division was the inaugural season of top-flight football in Bhutan. 10 teams competed, and the first championship was won by Royal Bhutan Army.

League standings

Results

References

Bhutan A-Division seasons
Bhutan
Bhutan
Foo